Rahul Balasaheb Aware (born 2 November 1991) is an Indian male freestyle wrestler who competes in the men's freestyle 57 kg category. He has won Gold medal in 57 kg division at the 2018 Commonwealth Games.He was a student of Olympian late Harishchandra Birajdar. At present, he is being trained by his guru and father in law Kaka Pawar. Currently he is member of Maharashtra police as a deputy superintendent of police. He is fondly called as "Nana" (Elderly brother) by his friends and family.

He was awarded with Arjuna Award in 2020 for his contribution to wrestling.

Career 
2008 Youth Commonwealth Pune India -  Rahul Won the Gold Medal

2009 Junior Asian Wrestling Championship Won the Gold Medal

2009 Junior World Wrestling Championship Silver Medal

2011 Commonwealth Wrestling championship Gold medal

2011 Asian wrestling championship won Bronze medal

2017 Commonwealth wrestling championship Silver medal

2018 21st Commonwealth Games gold medal in the 57 kg freestyle

2019 world ranking series wrestling tournament won Bronze medal

2019 Yasar Dogu World ranking series won Gold medal

2019 Asian wrestling championship won Bronze medal

2019 World wrestling championship won Bronze medal

2020 Asian Wrestling Championship Bronze medal in the 61 kg freestyle

7  Time Gold medalist in National Championships

2011 Asian Wrestling Championship 
At the tournament in Tashkent, Uzbekistan, Rahul won the bronze medal in the men's freestyle 55 kg category.

In the first round, Rahul faced Rasul Kaliev of Kazakhstan and beat him 3:1. In the next round, he lost 1:3 to Yang Kyong-il of North Korea. Being able to qualify for the repechage round, his first repechage opponent was Nasibulla Kurbanov of Uzbekistan and beat him 3:1. He was able to contest for the bronze medal against Firas Al Ali Rifaee from Syria and won it 5:0.

2011 Commonwealth Wrestling Championships 
At the tournament in Melbourne, Rahul won the gold medal in the men's freestyle 55 kg category, beating out Gilbert Musonza of Canada and Craig McKenna of Scotland.

2016 Olympics 
Sports Minister Sarbananda Sonowal announced earlier in April 2015, that 45 athletes will be provided financial support under the 'Target Olympic Podium' programme devised by the Indian Government. The Minister said recent performance, consistency in performance, performance vis-a-vis international standards were among the criteria followed while selecting the athletes.

Rahul, along with fellow wrestlers Sushil Kumar (men's freestyle 74 kg), Yogeshwar Dutt (men's freestyle 66 kg), Amit Kumar (men's freestyle 57 kg) get Rs. 7.5 million each, while Bajrang (men's freestyle 66 kg), Babita Kumari (women's 53 kg) and Vinesh Phogat (women's 48 kg) will be awarded RS. 4.5 million each.

2018 Commonwealth Games 
Rahul won gold medal in 2018 Commonwealth Games at Gold Coast. In a gripping final bout against Canada's Steven Takahashi, Aware won 15-7 despite struggling with injury in the latter half. This is the first gold for Aware in CWG.

Other titles 
 Golden Grand Prix, 2010 – Bronze
 Dave Schultz Memorial Tournament, 2012, Silver

References

External links 
 Rahul Balasaheb Aware – FILA database

Indian male sport wrestlers
1991 births
Living people
Wrestlers at the 2018 Commonwealth Games
Commonwealth Games gold medallists for India
Commonwealth Games medallists in wrestling
Sport wrestlers from Maharashtra
People from Beed district
World Wrestling Championships medalists
Recipients of the Arjuna Award
Asian Wrestling Championships medalists
Medallists at the 2018 Commonwealth Games